In 2001, the IETF set up the pseudowire emulation edge to edge working group, and this group was given the acronym PWE3 (the 3 standing for the third power of E, i.e. EEE). The working group was chartered to develop an architecture for service provider edge-to-edge PWs, and service-specific documents detailing the encapsulation techniques. 

In computer networking and telecommunications, a pseudowire (PW) is an emulation of a native service over a packet-switched network (PSN). The native service may be ATM, Frame Relay, Ethernet, low-rate TDM, or SONET/SDH, while the PSN may be MPLS, IP (either IPv4 or IPv6), or L2TPv3.

The working group chairs were originally Danny McPherson and Luca Martini, 
but following Martini's resignation Stewart Bryant became co-chair.

External links
 Charter for PWE3 Working Group : http://datatracker.ietf.org/wg/pwe3/charter/

Computer network organizations